Hernandez Reservoir is an artificial lake created in by impounding water from the San Benito River in the Diablo Mountain Range of San Benito County, California.

See also
 List of dams and reservoirs in California
 List of lakes in California

References
 

Reservoirs in San Benito County, California
Diablo Range
Reservoirs in California
Reservoirs in Northern California